Hardheim is a municipality in the district of Neckar-Odenwald-Kreis, in Baden-Württemberg, Germany. The town is twinned with Müntschemier in Switzerland and Suippes in France. Its existence is first mentioned in written form in 1050. The township consists of Hardheim, Ruedental, Schweinberg, Gerichtstetten, Erfeld, Bretzingen, Dornberg, Ruetschdorf, Vollmersdorf and Breitenau.

References

Neckar-Odenwald-Kreis